Daniel Fernholm (born December 20, 1983) is a Swedish former professional ice hockey defenseman. He last played for Djurgårdens IF of the Swedish Hockey League (SHL). Fernholm was selected by the Pittsburgh Penguins in the 4th round (101st overall) of the 2002 NHL Entry Draft.

Playing career
Fernholm was drafted in the 4th round, 101st overall, in the 2002 NHL Entry Draft by the Pittsburgh Penguins. After beginning his career with Djurgårdens IF in 2004, he spent the 2005–06 season in the United States, playing with the Penguins affiliates, the Wheeling Nailers and the Wilkes-Barre/Scranton Penguins. He appeared in nine playoff games for the Nailers of the ECHL, recording a goal and three assists before returning to his native Sweden.

Ferholm spent two seasons abroad in the Kontinental Hockey League with Neftekhimik Nizhnekamsk, Dinamo Minsk and Atlant Moscow Oblast before signing a one-year contract with HIFK in the Finnish SM-liiga.

On July 21, 2014, Fernholm returned to Djurgårdens IF on a two-year deal starting in the 2014–15 season.

Career statistics

Regular season and playoffs

International

Records
Linköpings HC club record for assists in a playoff season, defenceman (7), 2007–08
Linköpings HC club record for points in a playoff season, defenceman (10), 2007–08

References

External links

1983 births
Living people
Atlant Moscow Oblast players
HC Dinamo Minsk players
Djurgårdens IF Hockey players
HC Neftekhimik Nizhnekamsk players
HIFK (ice hockey) players
Huddinge IK players
HV71 players
Linköping HC players
Mora IK players
Pittsburgh Penguins draft picks
SC Rapperswil-Jona Lakers players
Ice hockey people from Stockholm
Swedish expatriate sportspeople in Italy
Swedish expatriate ice hockey players in the United States
Swedish ice hockey defencemen
Wheeling Nailers players
Wilkes-Barre/Scranton Penguins players
Expatriate ice hockey players in Italy
Swedish expatriate ice hockey players in Finland
Swedish expatriate sportspeople in Russia
Swedish expatriate sportspeople in Switzerland
Swedish expatriate sportspeople in Belarus
Expatriate ice hockey players in Belarus
Expatriate ice hockey players in Switzerland
Expatriate ice hockey players in Russia